Frane Poparić (born January 4, 1959 in Sinj, SFR Yugoslavia) is a Croatian retired football defender who played for several Croatian and foreign football clubs.

Career
Poparić began playing football with home town side NK Junak Sinj at age 14. He played professionally with Hajduk Split, NK Solin, VSE St. Pölten and HNK Šibenik.

References

External links
 
Profile at Hrrepka
Profile at Bundesliga

1959 births
Living people
People from Sinj
Association football defenders
Yugoslav footballers
Croatian footballers
HNK Hajduk Split players
NK Solin players
FC Linz players
SV Leibnitz Flavia Solva players
SKN St. Pölten players
HNK Šibenik players
Yugoslav First League players
Austrian Football Bundesliga players
Croatian Football League players
Yugoslav expatriate footballers
Expatriate footballers in Austria
Yugoslav expatriate sportspeople in Austria
Croatian expatriate footballers
Croatian expatriate sportspeople in Austria